was a Japanese long-distance runner. He competed in the marathon at the 1952 Summer Olympics.

References

1929 births
2001 deaths
Athletes (track and field) at the 1952 Summer Olympics
Japanese male long-distance runners
Japanese male marathon runners
Olympic athletes of Japan
Asian Games medalists in athletics (track and field)
Asian Games silver medalists for Japan
Athletes (track and field) at the 1951 Asian Games
Medalists at the 1951 Asian Games